Paul Schulte may be:
Paul Clarence Schulte, 1890–1984, American Roman Catholic archbishop of Indianapolis
Paul Schulte, 1896–1975, missionary priest
Paul Schulte (basketball), Paralympic basketball player